Frank and Francesca is an Australian children's television series which first screened on the ABC in 1973.

The series of six 30 minute black & white episodes were based on the book of the same name by David Martin (1915-1997) It was produced by Oscar Whitbread for the Australian Broadcasting Commission and was directed by Rick Birch and Douglas Sharp.

Cast
 Allen Bickford as Frank
 Lenice Reed as Francesca
 Gus Mercurio 
 Peter Cummins
 Denny Lawrence
 Pauline Charleston
 Alan Wilson

See also
 List of Australian television series

References

External links
 
 Frank and Francesca at Classic TV Australia

Australian Broadcasting Corporation original programming
1973 Australian television series debuts
1973 Australian television series endings
Australian children's television series